Rhodopsalta microdora, also known as the little redtail cicada, is a species of insect that is endemic to New Zealand. This species was first described in 1936 by George Vernon Hudson and named Melampsalta microdora.

References

Cicadas of New Zealand
Insects described in 1936
Endemic fauna of New Zealand
Taxa named by George Hudson
Cicadettini
Endemic insects of New Zealand